Dave Early (5 April 1957 – 14 October 1996) was an English drummer and percussionist. He was best known as the original drummer for Sade. He also worked with Chris Rea, Van Morrison, The Chieftains, Mary Black, Ananta, and others. Later he moved to Belfast, where he played with traditional Irish artists.He Played Drums in the Belfast band Katmandu with Marty Lundy. He frequently worked with drummer-percussionist Martin Ditcham. He was originally with a band called Rookie in 1975/76 with (Gary Stoner, David Knipe and Ian Nix) they were managed by Henri Henroid.
He was the son of Henry and Gladys Early, he had two older brothers, John and William Early.

He died in a car accident in Ireland on 14 October 1996.

References

1957 births
1996 deaths
English drummers
Sade (band) members
20th-century drummers
Musicians from Belfast
Road incident deaths in the Republic of Ireland